Pedaran may refer to:
 Pedaran-e Olya
 Pedaran-e Sofla